Burns may refer to:

Astronomy 
 2708 Burns, an asteroid
 Burns (crater), on Mercury

People 
 Burns (surname), list of people and characters named Burns
 Burns (musician), Scottish record producer

Places in the United States 
 Burns, Colorado
 Burns, Kansas
 Burns, Missouri
 Burns, New York
 Burns, Oregon
 Burns, Tennessee
 Burns, Wisconsin
 Burns (community), Wisconsin
 Burns, Wyoming
 H.B. Burns Memorial Building, Washington, D.C.

Ships of the US Navy 
 USS Burns (DD-171), a WWI destroyer (1919–1930)
 USS Burns (DD-588), a WWII destroyer (1943 –1946)
 USS W. W. Burns (1861), a Civil-War schooner

Other uses 
 Burn, a skin injury 
 Burns London, an English guitar maker
 Burns Night, a celebration of Scottish poet Robert Burns

See also 
 Burn (disambiguation)
 Burns Township (disambiguation)
 Burnside (disambiguation)
 Burnsville (disambiguation)
 Burns (surname), a surname
 Byrnes (disambiguation)